Putnam Township may refer to:

 Putnam Township, Fayette County, Iowa
 Putnam Township, Linn County, Iowa
 Putnam Township, Anderson County, Kansas
 Putnam Township, Stafford County, Kansas, in Stafford County, Kansas
 Putnam Township, Michigan
 Putnam Township, Tioga County, Pennsylvania

Township name disambiguation pages